Valdez–Cordova Census Area was a census area located in the state of Alaska, United States. As of the 2010 census, the population was 9,636. It was part of the Unorganized Borough and therefore has no borough seat. On January 2, 2019, it was abolished and replaced by the Chugach Census Area and the Copper River Census Area.

Geography

Adjacent boroughs and census areas
 Southeast Fairbanks Census Area, Alaska – north
 Yakutat City and Borough, Alaska – southeast
 Kenai Peninsula Borough, Alaska – west
 Municipality of Anchorage, Alaska – west
 Matanuska-Susitna Borough, Alaska – west
 Yukon Territory, Canada – east

National protected areas
 Alaska Maritime National Wildlife Refuge (part of Gulf of Alaska unit)
 Middleton Island
 Chugach National Forest (part)
 Tetlin National Wildlife Refuge (part)
 Wrangell-St. Elias National Park and Preserve (part)
 Wrangell-Saint Elias Wilderness (part)

Demographics

As of the census of 2000, there were 10,195 people, 3,884 households, and 2,559 families residing in the census area.  The population density was less than 1 person per square mile (less than 1/km2).  There were 5,148 housing units at an average density of less than 1/sq mi (less than 1/km2).  The racial makeup of the census area was 75.90% White, 0.32% Black or African American, 13.25% Native American, 3.55% Asian, 0.26% Pacific Islander, 1.13% from other races, and 5.58% from two or more races.  2.81% of the population were Hispanic or Latino of any race. 2.33% reported speaking Spanish at home, while 2.26% speak Tagalog.

There were 3,884 households, out of which 37.30% had children under the age of 18 living with them, 52.10% were married couples living together, 8.50% had a female householder with no husband present, and 34.10% were non-families. 27.00% of all households were made up of individuals, and 4.90% had someone living alone who was 65 years of age or older.  The average household size was 2.58 and the average family size was 3.18.

In the census area, the population was spread out, with 29.60% under the age of 18, 7.00% from 18 to 24, 30.90% from 25 to 44, 26.50% from 45 to 64, and 6.00% who were 65 years of age or older.  The median age was 36 years. For every 100 females, there were 113.90 males.  For every 100 females age 18 and over, there were 115.90 males.

Communities

Cities
 Cordova
 Valdez
 Whittier

Census-designated places

 Chenega
 Chisana
 Chistochina
 Chitina
 Copper Center
 Gakona
 Glennallen
 Gulkana
 Kenny Lake
 McCarthy
 Mendeltna
 Mentasta Lake
 Nabesna
 Nelchina
 Paxson
 Silver Springs
 Slana
 Tatitlek
 Tazlina
 Tolsona
 Tonsina
 Willow Creek

Other places
 Copperville (former CDP)
 Eyak (within Cordova)

See also
 List of airports in the Valdez–Cordova Census Area

References

External links
 Census Area map, 2000 census: Alaska Department of Labor
 Census Area map, 2010 census: Alaska Department of Labor

Former counties of the United States